Obliterating endarteritis  is severe proliferating endarteritis (inflammation of the intima or inner lining of an artery) that results in an occlusion of the lumen of the artery.  Obliterating endarteritis can occur due to a variety of medical conditions such as a complication of radiation poisoning, tuberculosis meningitis or a syphilis infection.

References

Vascular diseases